Pagden may refer to:

Anthony Pagden (born 1945), author and professor of political science and history
Arthur Sampson Pagden (1858-1942), a colonial public servant
James Pagden (1814–1872), English cricketer